The Men's under-23 time trial of the 2017 UCI Road World Championships took place in Bergen, Norway on 18 September 2017. It was won by Mikkel Bjerg of Denmark, who finished 1' 05" faster than American rider Brandon McNulty.

Final classification
Source:

References

Men's under-23 time trial
UCI Road World Championships – Men's under-23 time trial